The 1900 Florida gubernatorial election was held on November 6, 1900. Democratic nominee William Sherman Jennings defeated Republican nominee Matthew B. MacFarlane with 80.98% of the vote.

General election

Candidates
Major party candidates
William Sherman Jennings, Democratic
Matthew B. MacFarlane, attorney, US Customs Service collector in Tampa, former Tampa City Council member

Other candidates
A.M. Morton, People's

Results

References

1900
Florida
Gubernatorial